See Lists of video games for related lists.
This is a comprehensive index of business simulation games, sorted chronologically. Information regarding date of release, developer, platform, setting and notability is provided when available. The table can be sorted by clicking on the small boxes next to the column headings.

Legend

List

See also 
List of city-building video games
List of roller coaster related video games
List of simulation video games

External links 

 Complete list of dynamic economic strategy games

References

Timelines of video games
Business simulation games